Variable costs are costs that change as the quantity of the good or service that a business produces changes. Variable costs are the sum of marginal costs over all units produced. They can also be considered normal costs. Fixed costs and variable costs make up the two components of total cost. Direct costs are costs that can easily be associated with a particular cost object. However, not all variable costs are direct costs. For example, variable manufacturing overhead costs are variable costs that are indirect costs, not direct costs.  Variable costs are sometimes called unit-level costs as they vary with the number of units produced.

Direct labor and overhead are often called conversion cost, while direct material and direct labor are often referred to as prime cost.

In marketing, it is necessary to know how costs divide between variable and fixed. This distinction is crucial in forecasting the earnings generated by various changes in unit sales and thus the financial impact of proposed marketing campaigns. In a survey of nearly 200 senior marketing managers, 60 percent responded that they found the "variable and fixed costs" metric very useful.

The level of variable cost is influenced by many factors, such as fixed cost, duration of project, uncertainty and discount rate. An analytical formula of variable cost as a function of these factors has been derived. It can be used to assess how different factors impact variable cost and total return in an investment.

Explanation

Example 1

Assume a business produces clothing. A variable cost of this product would be the direct material, i.e., cloth, and the direct labor. If the business uses a room, a sewing machine, and 8 hours of a laborer's time with 6 yards of cloth to make a shirt, then the cost of labor and cloth increases if two shirts are produced, and those are the variable costs. The facility and equipment are fixed costs, incurred regardless of whether even one shirt is made. 

The amount of materials and labor that goes into each shirt increases  with the number of shirts produced. In this sense, the cost "varies" as production varies.  In the long run, if the business planned to make 0 shirts, it would choose to have 0 machines and 0 rooms, but in the short run, even if it produces no shirts it has incurred those costs. Similarly, even if the total cost of producing 1 shirt is greater than the revenue from selling the shirt, the business would produce the shirt anyway if the revenue were greater than the variable cost. If the revenue that they are receiving is greater than their variable cost but less than their total cost, they will continue to operate while accruing an economic loss. If their total cost is less than their variable cost in the short run, the business should shut down. If revenue is greater than their total cost, this firm will have positive economic profit.

Example 2
Over a one-day horizon, a factory's costs may be almost entirely fixed costs, not variable.  The company  must pay for the building,  the employee benefits,  and the machinery regardless of whether anything is produced that day, and for the sake of employee relations it may decide to pay them even if a bomb threat requires them all to be evacuated. The main variable cost will be materials and any energy costs actually used in production. 

Over a six-month horizon, the factory will be better able to change the amount of labor to fit the desired output, either by using overtime hours, laying off employees, or hiring new employees. Thus, much of their labor becomes a variable cost-- though not the cost of the managers, whose salaries are paid regardless of output. 

Over a five-year horizon, all costs can become variable costs. The business can decide to shut down and sell off its buildings and equipment if long-run total cost exceeds their long-run total revenue, or to expand and increase the amount of both of them if their long-run total revenue exceeds their long-run total cost, which would include their variable costs. It can change its entire labor force, managerial as well as line workers. 

Thus, which costs are classified as variable and which as fixed depends on the time horizon, most simply classified into short run and long run, but really with an entire range of time horizons.

Common Examples of Variable Costs 
While variable costs are a part of anything business related, some common examples include sales commissions, labor costs, and the costs of raw materials.

See also

 Cost
 Fixed cost
 Cost accounting
 Cost curve
 Cost driver
 Semi variable cost
 Total cost
 Total revenue share
 Contribution margin

Notes

References

Prime Cost Explanation and Examples by Play Accounting.

Costs
Management accounting
Production economics
Corporate development
Management cybernetics